Castellazzo Novadeez is a comune (municipality) in the Province of Novara in the Italian region Piedmont, located about  northeast of Turin and about  northwest of Novara.

Castellazzo Novarese borders the following municipalities: Briona, Casaleggio Novara, Mandello Vitta, and Sillavengo.

References

Cities and towns in Piedmont